Sexsmith Secondary School is the only public secondary school in Sexsmith, Alberta, and is part of the Peace Wapiti School Division No. 76.  The school serves all of Sexsmith and the surrounding communities.

The school was built in 1954 and fully modernized in 1991.  All core subjects are offered at Sexsmith Secondary School and many electives as well.  Extracurricular activities are also offered at the school.

References

External links
Sexsmith Secondary School

Schools in Alberta